Légifrance is the official website of the French government for the publication of legislation, regulations, and legal information. Access to the site is free.

Virtually complete, it presents or refers to all concerned institutions or administrations, all texts still in force since 1539  and all the upper courts jurisprudence since 1986 as well as the most pertinent one of all courts since 1875.

See also
 Journal Officiel de la République Française

References
All texts in French unless otherwise noted.

External links
 Légifrance
 Décret n° 2002-1064 du 7 août 2002 relatif au service public de la diffusion du droit par l'internet
 laws and regulations, including updated versions of some important texts;
 the Codes;
 laws, regulations and personal measures as published in the Journal Officiel de la République Française

French websites
Online law databases
Government-owned websites